Douglas Dwight Payton (born July 22, 1952) is a former gridiron football player who played professionally for the Montreal Alouettes, Montreal Concordes and Denver Gold.

References

1952 births
Living people
Colorado Buffaloes football players
Montreal Alouettes players
Montreal Concordes players
Denver Gold players
Canadian football offensive linemen
American football offensive linemen